Steve Kirit (born 1972) is an American professional strongman competitor. Steve is a 2-time winner of America's Strongest Man. Steve competed twice in the Arnold Strongman Classic, finishing 5th in 2003 and 9th in 2004. Steve competed in the World's Strongest Man in 2002, 2003 and 2004. Steve trained with fellow strongman competitor Steve MacDonald. Steve finished 7th in the first IFSA World Cup Championships in 2004. Had nine 1st place victories and five 2nd-place finishes as a pro, and finished in the top 5 in the USA in 3 of the 4 U.S. Nationals he appeared in. Steve retired from professional competition in 2006.

References

| colspan="3" style="text-align:center;"| America's Strongest Man 
|- 
|  style="width:30%; text-align:center;"| Preceded by:Brian Schoonveld
|  style="width:40%; text-align:center;"| First (2002–03)
|  style="width:30%; text-align:center;"| Succeeded by:Van Hatfield

American strength athletes
1971 births
Living people